Aviculin is a lignan. It is bio-active isolate of Pseudocydonia sinensis  or Polygonum aviculare.

References 

Lignans
Rhamnosides